Tetyana Pylypivna Vilchynska (born June 10, 1962, Birches, USSR) is a Ukrainian linguist, Doctor of Philology (2001), Professor (2012).

Biography 
She graduated from the Faculty of Philology of Odessa State University. II Mechnikov (1984). Associate Professor (2001-2012), since 2012 - Professor of the Department of Ukrainian Language, since 2014 - Dean of the Faculty of Philology (now the Faculty of Philology and Journalism) of Ternopil Volodymyr Hnatiuk National Pedagogical University.

Research interests: Lexicology and grammar of the Ukrainian language, cognitive linguistics, linguoconceptology, ethnolinguistics, linguoculturology, pragmalinguistics, axiological linguistics, linguopoetics.

Editor-in-Chief of "Scientific Notes of TNPU. Series Linguistics", a member of the editorial boards of journals "Scientific Notes of TNPU. Series Literary Studies", "Media Space" (TNPU named after Volodymyr Hnatiuk), "Philological Discourse" (Khmelnytsky Academy of Humanities and Education); reviewer of other professional publications.

She is the author of more than 170 publications, as well as numerous textbooks, manuals, scientific articles and teaching materials on the history of language and modern Ukrainian literary language.

Sources 
 Вільчинська Тетяна Пилипівна // ТНПУ.
 Сердечні вітання! // ТНПУ.
 Лінгвістична творчість Вільчинської Тетяни Пилипівни // Наукова бібліотека ТНПУ.
 Тетяна Вільчинська // Чтиво.

Linguists from Ukraine
Women linguists
Living people
1962 births
Odesa University alumni
Ternopil Volodymyr Hnatyuk National Pedagogical University people
Ukrainian editors
Ukrainian women editors